Pterotaea newcombi is a species of geometrid moth in the family Geometridae. It is found in North America.

The MONA or Hodges number for Pterotaea newcombi is 6569.

Subspecies
These two subspecies belong to the species Pterotaea newcombi:
 Pterotaea newcombi newcombi
 Pterotaea newcombi orinomos Rindge, 1970

References

Further reading

 

Boarmiini
Articles created by Qbugbot
Moths described in 1914